Mohammad Shahjahan (born 3 October 2000) is an Indian Professional Footballer who plays as a Midfielder For Delhi football club.He Also Represented India In The U-17 fifa world cup.

Club career
Shahjahan joined I-League 2nd Division side Delhi United on a season-long loan in February 2018. However, by May 2018, he returned to his parent club, Minerva Punjab. On summer of 2019, the midfielder moved to Jamshedpur FC Reserves.

Career statistics

Club

Notes

References

2000 births
Living people
Indian footballers
Association football midfielders
RoundGlass Punjab FC players
I-League players
People from Imphal
Footballers from Manipur